Corkery is an extinct town in Dallas and Laclede counties, in the U.S. state of Missouri. The GNIS classifies it as a populated place. The community area is located on a ridge surrounded on three sides by an entrenched meander of the Niangua River which is about 300 feet below the ridgetop. The location is only accessible by road from Laclede County.

A post office called Corkery was established in 1893, and remained in operation until 1944. The community was named after either Mike Corkery, a local merchant,  or Ed Corkery, a millwright who came to the area in 1863 to install millworks and ended up staying, opening a store, and becoming the first postmaster.

References

Ghost towns in Missouri
Former populated places in Dallas County, Missouri
Former populated places in Laclede County, Missouri